Jernbanetorget is both a rapid transit station on the Oslo Metro and a tram stop of the Oslo Tramway. The metro station is in the Common Tunnel used by all lines under the city centre. It is located between Stortinget to the west and Grønland to the east. Until the construction of the station at Stortinget, Jernbanetorget was the end station for the eastern lines in downtown. Along with the Oslo Central Station, Oslo Bus Terminal and the tram and bus station above ground, Jernbanetorget is the largest transport hub in Norway.

All six of the subway lines (including the Ring Route - which is a part of Line 5) pass through the station, totaling 24 departures per hour during most of the day.

It is also the central hub of the tram network with five of the six lines using either the platform in front of Christiania Hotel or the one in front of the public transport information centre, Trafikanten. The sixth line, line 13, does not serve Jernbanetorget, but it stops nearby at Dronningens gate.

History

The tram stop opened as part of the Briskeby Line on the 3rd of March 1894. It was originally operated by Kristiania Elektriske Sporvei and ran from the Oslo East Station to Majorstuen. There were several other lines that originally terminated here including the Frogner Line and the Skillebekk Line. In 1924, the tram companies were merged to create Oslo Sporveier, which now operated the station. Afterwards, the square of Jernbanetorget, became a location to transfer between other tram lines. There was also a trolleybus route that operated and terminated here in the mid-20th century. Also during the 1950s, the square had a complicated track arrangement. When the original Gamleby Line's tracks were shifted to run through Schweigaards gate in 1960, the trams on the Ekeberg Line terminated here. In 1966, the metro station called Jernbanetorget was established. The metro station was originally the terminus of metro's eastbound lines until Stortinget was built in 1977.

References

External links
 

Oslo Metro stations in Oslo
Railway stations opened in 1966
1966 establishments in Norway